Wojciech Marek (born 27 May 2001) is a Polish tennis player.

Marek has a career high ATP singles ranking of 629 achieved on 22 February 2021. He also has a career high ATP doubles ranking of 806 achieved on 22 February 2021.

Marek represents Poland at the Davis Cup, where he has a W/L record of 0–1.

References

External links

2001 births
Living people
Polish male tennis players
Sportspeople from Bytom